Ayoub Vali is an Iranian footballer who currently plays for Foolad in the Persian Gulf Pro League.

Club career
Vali is a graduate of the Foolad Youth Academy and has played his entire career for Foolad.

Club career statistics

 Assist Goals

Honours

Club
Foolad
Iran Pro League: 2013–14
Hazfi Cup: 2020–21
Iranian Super Cup: 2021

References
Profile at Persianleague.com

1987 births
Living people
Persian Gulf Pro League players
Foolad FC players
Iranian footballers
People from Khorramshahr
Association football defenders
Sportspeople from Khuzestan province
Iranian sportspeople in doping cases